Katrien Verstuyft (born 21 July 1982 in Antwerp), is a Belgian professional triathlete, National Champion (Sprint, Olympic Distance, and Team) of the year 2009, and member of the National Team.

Katrien Verstuyft lives in Mortsel and represents the local club ATRIAC.

In 2009, Verstyuft also took part in the French Club Championship Series Lyonnaise des Eaux, representing Charleville Tri Ardennes.
At Tours/Tourangeaux (19 July 2009), Paris (30 August 2009) and at the Grand Final in La Baule (27 September 2009) she placed 18th, 14th, and 18th respectively. In 2010, she did not compete in this French circuit though the club still enumerates her among its elite athletes.
Tri Ardennes almost exclusively depends on foreign elite stars like Olga Dmitrieva and Emma Moffatt.
In 2010 it could nominate only one French female triathlete for only one competition, i.e. Jeanne Collonge at Dunkirk.

ITU Competitions 
In the two years from 2009 to 2010, Verstuyft took part in 11 ITU competitions and achieved 2 top ten positions. In April 2011, Verstuyft placed 11th and 8th at the European Cup triathlons in Antalya and Quarteira respectively.

The following list is based upon the official ITU rankings and the athlete's ITU Profile Page.
Unless indicated otherwise the following competitions are triathlons (Olympic Distance) and belong to the Elite category.

DNF = did not finish · DNS = did not start

Notes

External links

 

Belgian female triathletes
Living people
1982 births
Triathletes at the 2012 Summer Olympics
Triathletes at the 2016 Summer Olympics
Olympic triathletes of Belgium
Sportspeople from Antwerp
20th-century Belgian women
21st-century Belgian women